Ittehad Chemicals Limited is a publicly listed chemical manufacturing company in Pakistan and the company stock is publicly traded on the Pakistan Stock Exchange.

History
The company was commissioned in 1964 as United Chemicals by Saigol Group and started production with an initial installed capacity of 60 metric ton/day of caustic soda and 54 metric tons/day of chlorine. Rising demand facilitated the first expansion, carried out in 1969, which increased capacity to 90 metric tons/day of caustic soda and 81 metric tons/day of chlorine. 

In 1972, Prime Minister Zulfiqar Ali Bhutto began a Nationalisation in Pakistan plan to take over privately-run companies. United Chemicals was nationalized by the Pakistani Government, renamed Ittehad Chemicals, and put under the control of the Federal Chemical and Ceramics Corporation Limited (FPCCL).  Another company, Insecticide Pakistan Limited., was nationalized and renamed Ittehad Pesticides Limited in 1973. Later, the two companies were merged to form Ittehad Chemicals Limited. In 1983, the production capacity of Ittehad Chemicals was further increased to 150 metric tons/day of caustic soda and 135 metric tons/day of chlorine. Later, through another expansion, capacity was enhanced to 250 metric tons/day.  By the year 2006, overall capacity had reached 380 metric tons/day. 

After encountering financial difficulties and turbulence throughout the years of company nationalization, Ittehad Chemicals was ultimately privatized in 1991, and taken over by the Chemi Group of Companies which later on became Ittehad Group. This transition brought with it a new set of challenges, a bold vision, and a transformational proactive behavior that set a new era of economic growth and economic stability in motion. 

The present product line includes industrial caustic soda sodium hydroxide (solid, liquid and flakes), liquid chlorine, hydrochloric acid, sodium hypochlorite (liquid bleach), zinc sulfate mono, bleaching earth (Shaffaf), sulfuric acid and LABSA.

Calcium chloride and chlorinated paraffin wax are being added in new product lines.

In the last quarter of 2012, Ittehad Agri Division was launched and now the company is successfully marketing Crystal Zinc, Humic Acid, and Aqua Zinc. Ittehad Chemicals was formally incorporated as a company in 1991.

The vision of the directors is broadening the company's horizon and the whole group is under the process of revitalization and expansion. Ittehad Chemicals is based in Lahore, Pakistan with its manufacturing plant in nearby Sheikhupura.

References

External links
Ittehad Chemicals Limited

Chemical companies of Pakistan
Manufacturing companies of Pakistan
Companies listed on the Pakistan Stock Exchange
Companies based in Lahore
Pakistani brands